Travis Pointe Country Club is a private country club and golf course in the central United States, located in Ann Arbor, Michigan. Founded  in 1977, the par-72 golf course has six sets of tees and measures  from the back tees.

It has hosted the LPGA Volvik Championship on the LPGA Tour since its debut in 2016.

Course

References

External links

LPGA Volvik Championship

Golf clubs and courses in Michigan
Sports venues in Washtenaw County, Michigan
1977 establishments in Michigan